The 1990 NCAA Division I Outdoor Track and Field Championships were contested May 30−June 2 at Wallace Wade Stadium at Duke University in Durham, North Carolina in order to determine the individual and team national champions of men's and women's collegiate Division I outdoor track and field events in the United States.

These were the 68th annual men's championships and the ninth annual women's championships. This was the Blue Devils' first time hosting the event.

For the second consecutive year, LSU topped both the men's and women's standings; it was the LSU men's team's third team title and the fourth consecutive, as well as fourth overall, for the Lady Tigers. This would go on to be the fourth of LSU's eleven consecutive women's national championships in track and field between 1987 and 1997.

Team results 
 Note: Top 10 only
 (H) = Hosts
 Full results

Men's standings

Women's standings

Individual results

References

NCAA Men's Outdoor Track and Field Championship
NCAA Division I Outdoor Track and Field Championships
NCAA
NCAA Division I Outdoor Track and Field Championships
NCAA Division I Outdoor Track and Field Championships
NCAA Women's Outdoor Track and Field Championship